Zal Qoli Kandi (also Romanized as Zāl Qolī Kandī; also known as Zāl Kandī) is a village in Qeshlaq-e Jonubi Rural District, Qeshlaq Dasht District, Bileh Savar County, Ardabil Province, Iran. At the 2006 census, its population was 88, in 16 families.

References 

Populated places in Bileh Savar County
Towns and villages in Bileh Savar County